Christiaan Snouck Hurgronje (8 February 1857 – 26 June 1936) was a Dutch scholar of Oriental cultures and languages and advisor on native affairs to the colonial government of the Dutch East Indies (now Indonesia).

Born in Oosterhout in 1857, he became a theology student at Leiden University in 1874. He received his doctorate at Leiden in 1880 with his dissertation 'Het Mekkaansche Feest' ("The Festivities of Mecca"). He became a professor at the Leiden School for Colonial Civil Servants in 1881.

Snouck, who was fluent in Arabic, through mediation with the Ottoman governor in Jeddah, was examined by a delegation of scholars from Mecca in 1884 and, upon successfully completion of the examination, was allowed to commence a pilgrimage to the Holy Muslim city of Mecca in 1885. He was one of the first Western scholars of Oriental cultures to do so.

A pioneering traveler, he was a rare Western presence in Mecca, but embraced the culture and religion of his hosts with passion in such that he successfully gave people the impression that he had converted to Islam. He admitted that he pretended to be a Muslim as he explained in a letter sent to his college friend, Carl Bezold on 18 February 1886 which is now archived in Heidelberg University Library. In 1888 he became member of the Royal Netherlands Academy of Arts and Sciences.

In 1889 he became professor of Malay at Leiden University and official advisor to the Dutch government on colonial affairs. He wrote more than 1,400 papers on the situation in Atjeh and the position of Islam in the Dutch East Indies, as well as on the colonial civil service and nationalism.

As the adviser of J. B. van Heutsz, he took an active role in the final part (1898–1905) of the Aceh War (1873–1914). He used his knowledge of Islamic culture to devise strategies which significantly helped crush the resistance of the Aceh inhabitants and impose Dutch colonial rule on them, ending a 40-year war with varying casualty estimates of between 50,000 and 100,000 inhabitants dead and about a million wounded.

His success in the Aceh War earned him influence in shaping colonial administration policy throughout the rest of the Dutch East Indies, however deeming his advice insufficiently implemented he returned to the Netherlands in 1906. Back in the Netherlands Snouck continued a successful academic career.

Background 
When the colony of the Dutch East Indies (now: Indonesia) was founded in 1800, the dominant monotheistic religion of most of the indigenous peoples of the Indies Archipelago was Islam. Due to strong religious syncretism this form of Islam mixed with elements from older religious beliefs. Arab merchants and Indigenous haji pilgrims returning from Mecca, increasingly advocated a more orthodox interpretation of Islam. This led to the rise of the strict 'santri' variant of Islam. The nominal Muslims were called "abangan".

Most Christian churches adhered to the guidelines set by the colonial government. The Protestant and Catholic mission showed due diligence in following government strategy, but nevertheless enjoyed considerable autonomy. Moreover, Dutch colonialism was never grounded in religious zealotry. However, during the 19th century Christian missionaries became increasingly active, regularly leading to clashes or frictions, between Christianity and Islam and between the different Christian denominations.

The relationship between the government and Islam was uncomfortable. The Dutch colonial power used the principle of separation of church and state and wanted to remain neutral in religious matters. Nonetheless equally important was the desire to maintain peace and order and Islam was an early source of inspiration to revolt against the colonial administration. Social and political motives intertwined with religious desires repeatedly exploded into riots and wars like the Padri War (1821–1837) and Aceh War (1873–1914) in Sumatra.

Life in the Dutch East Indies 

As of 1871, the colonial governor-general relied on an 'advisor for indigenous affairs' to manage these tensions. Due to his expertise in Arabic and Islam, Prof.Dr. Snouck Hurgronje served in this capacity between 1889 and 1905. His overall advice was to intervene as little as possible in religious affairs and allow optimal freedom of religion. Only manifestations of political Islam were to be countered. Although his advice was implemented and guided colonial policy for years to come, the emergence of Sarekat Islam in 1912 gave rise to the first East Indies political party based on Islamic principles.

Aspiring to reform Dutch colonial policies, Snouck moved to the Dutch East Indies in 1889. Snouck was originally appointed as researcher of Islamic education in Buitenzorg and professor of Arabic in Batavia in 1890. Although at first he was not allowed to visit Aceh on Sumatra, he rejected offers to return to Europe from the University of Leiden and Cambridge University. In 1890 he married the daughter of an indigenous nobleman in Ciamis, West Java. Due to the controversy this caused in the Netherlands, Snouck called the marriage a "scientific opportunity" to study and analyse Islamic wedding ceremonies. Four children were born from this marriage.

Between 1891 and 1892, Snouck—who was by now fluent in Acehnese, Malay and Javanese—finally traveled to Aceh, which was devastated by the prolonged Aceh War. Under the name "Haji Abdul Ghaffar", he built a relationship of trust with religious elements of the region's population. In his Report on the religious-political situation in Aceh, Snouck strongly opposed the use of military terror tactics against the Acehnese and instead advocated well-organized systematic espionage and winning the support of aristocratic elites. He, however, did identify certain radical Muslim scholars (Ulama) that would only succumb to show of force.

In 1898 Snouck became Colonel Van Heutsz's closest advisor in "pacifying" Aceh, and his advice was instrumental in reversing Dutch fortune in ending the protracted Aceh War. The relationship between Heutsz and Snouck deteriorated when Heutsz proved unwilling to implement Snouck's ideal for an ethical and enlightened administration. In 1903, Snouck married another indigenous woman, with whom he had a son in 1905. Disappointed with colonial policies, he returned to the Netherlands the next year to continue a successful academic career.

Snouck was a friend of the Arab Grand Mufti of Batavia, Habib Usman bin Yahya, who issued fatwa to support the Dutch war against Aceh.

Sojourn in Mecca (1884–1885) 

In the foreword to Snouck Hurgronje's treatise Mekka in the Latter Part of the 19th Century, we come across the following:

"In 1884–1885 he [i.e. Snouck Hurgronje] had an opportunity to stay for a year in Arabia, about half the year in Mekka, where he lived as a student of Muhammadan learning, and half the year in Jeddah. The result of his experiences is given in a work in German in two volumes, under the title "Mekka", published in 1888–1889. His chief object was not to study the Hajj, an accurate knowledge of which is easier to obtain by reading some of the innumerable pilgrims' handbooks (manâsik) than by attending the ceremonies in the fearful crowd gathering yearly in the Holy Town, in the Valley of Mina and on the Plain of Arafât, but rather to become intimately acquainted with the daily life of the Mekkans and of the thousands of Muhammadans from all parts of the world living in Mekka for material or spiritual purposes".

In an article published in July 1929, Arthur Jeffery elaborates further:

"Our standard scientific work on Mecca and the pilgrimage we owe to the next Christian pilgrim on our roll, Prof. C. Snouck Hurgronje, the Dutch Orientalist, who still lives at Leiden, though retired from his Professorship. His treatise on the origin and nature of the pilgrimage was written in 1880, and in 1885, after having spent five months in the Dutch Consulate at Jiddah, he journeyed to Mecca, where for six months he lived as a student of the Koran, and gathered the material for his monumental work on that city. As Burckhardt had been mainly interested in the topography of the city, and the pilgrimage ceremony, Snouck Hurgronje interested himself particularly in a social study of the Meccan community, and so complete is his work that he has left nothing to later writers save to note the changes made by passing years.

"Hurgronje seems to have enjoyed the freest intercourse with all strata of society in Mecca, and with an adequate scholarly preparation for his task has been able to make Meccan social life a thing of living interest to us. No other writer has so clearly pictured the condition of a society which is welded from an unusually varied conglomeration of nationalities, and which has been affected by the superstitions and prejudices of them all. His picture of the blatant immorality of the city is blacker even than Burckhardt's, and is the evidence of a witness who certainly cannot be accused of prejudice against Islam".

The fact that Snouck Hurgronje spent his time in Mecca as a convert to Islam has been criticized by some as "treachery and knavery." For instance the right-wing late Pakistani civil servant and Ambassador of Pakistan to the Netherlands in 1962, Qudrat Ullah Shahab, goes so far in his autobiography as to insinuate:

"A clear example of a group of Dutch Orientalists which, through their misleading statements and thoughts in the garb of knowledge and wisdom, played a conspicuous role in distorting the features of Islam and Muslims, in causing prejudice against Islam in the minds of the Westerners and in serving as an authority for some amongst the Muslims who suffer from inferiority complex, is that of C. Snouck Hurgronje. This gentleman was a professor of Oriental studies at Leiden University. In 1884 he spent six months in Jeddah and then went on to live in Mecca for six more months by adopting a fake Islamic name. The entry of Non-Muslims is prohibited within the precincts of the Haram [Mecca]. Yet the worthy Professor lived there under the false disguise of a Muslim and composed his German book "Mekka" (2 volumes) on the way of life of the Meccan Muslims. He had already authored a Dutch book on the Hajj called 'Het Mekkaansche Feest'. It is an exercise in futility to seek good will, empathy and fairness in the intentions of those who set about to explore the ceremonies of Islam and the conditions of the Muslims, wrapped in the garb of treachery and knavery. Such writings have resulted in creating the Dutch mental-image of Muslims as poly-haremic, licentious, barbaric and mis-managers."

According to L.I. Graf, there was no other possibility for Snouck Hurgronje to be admitted to Mecca without becoming a practicing Muslim:

"Wel bestond voor SH natuurlijk geen andere mogelijkheid toegang tot Mekka te krijgen dan door den moslims een moslim te worden."

i.e. "However for Snouck Hurgronje, of course, there was no other way to gain access to Mecca than by becoming a Muslim"

David Samuel Margoliouth, reminding people of the predicament of non-Muslim observers of the Meccan annual pilgrimage in the nineteenth century, makes the following remark:

"It is asserted that the number of the former [read: Europeans] who have succeeded in witnessing the pilgrimage and returning to tell the tale is small compared with that of those who have sacrificed their lives in the attempt; and those who have accomplished the task safely have in most cases done so by the exercise of great cunning and ingenuity."

This is seconded by Arthur Jeffery in following terms:

"Reliable authorities have told us in regard to Mecca, that hardly a pilgrimage season passes without somebody being done to death on the suspicion of being a Christian in disguise."

To further add to the controversy of Hurgronje's cultural appropriation to immorally gain access to a sacred site to perpetuate colonial interests, was his own racist remarks, “HE MAY HAVE AS MUCH SYMPATHY FOR ISLAM AND ITS BELIEVERS AS HE LIKES, BUT MOST OF THE TIME HIS [I.E. THE ORIENTALIST’S] ASSURANCES WILL BE MET WITH MISTRUST IN THIS REMOTE PLACE (MECCA) WITH THE MOST NARROW OF MINDS.” Despite adopting the Arab name, “Abdul-Gaffar” Hurgronje still had the caucasity to consider Arabs as narrow-minded.

Dar al-Islam Vs. Dar al-Harb 
After the Indian Mutiny of 1857 in which Muslims of India played a predominant role, the British tasked a civil servant, William Wilson Hunter, to submit a report on whether the Indian Muslims were "bound in Conscience to rebel against the Queen"? W.W. Hunter completed his report which subsequently became an influential work titled The Indian Musalmans. In it, W.W. Hunter advanced the pragmatic view that a religious argument, or fatwa, could be used in favor of Her Majesty's Government as much as against it.

He wrote:  "The Law Doctors of Northern Hindustan set out by tacitly assuming that India is a Country of the Enemy [Dar al-Harb], and deduce therefrom that religious rebellion is uncalled for. The Calcutta Doctors [i.e. Islamic clerics] declare India to be a Country of Islam [Dar al-Islam], and conclude that religious rebellion is therefore unlawful. This result must be accepted as alike satisfactory to the well-to-do Muhammadans, whom it saves from the peril of contributing to the Fanatic Camp on our Frontier, and gratifying to ourselves, as proving that the Law and the Prophets can be utilized on the side of loyalty as well as on the side of sedition."

Snouck Hurgronje, however, did not agree with W. Hunter's conclusion. He was of the view that close acquaintance with Islamic theological literature on the issue of Dar al-Islam Vs. Dar al-Harb did not warrant Hunter's pragmatism. He wrote:

Jihād 

In January 1915 Hurgronje published the article "Holy War made in Germany" in the well-known Dutch journal De Gids. The article is a polemic against European culture that condemns the moral outrages of World War I. Hurgronje blamed Germany and its cadre of orientalist scholars for the declaration of Jihad made by the Ottoman government in 1914.   He accused the German orientalists of undermining the goals of modernizing Islamic society. According to Hurgronje the war was a consequence of forces beyond the control of Muslims. He argues that Muslims are capable of progress and that he had in common with "the Turk" the ideas of "religious peace and freedom of thought". He saw Jihad as a medieval phenomenon and that the 1908 Revolution had ended this medievalism. The "fetish of the Caliphate" (and the associated Jihad), he says, experiences a revival only under European pressure. His friendship with Carl Heinrich Becker who was attacked in the article was severely strained as a result.

He writes:

Final years 

Back in the Netherlands Snouck accepted several professorships at Leiden University, including Arabic language, Acehnese language and Islamic education. He continued to produce numerous elaborate academic studies and became the international authority on all matters relating to the Arab world and Muslim religion. His expert advice on urgent issues was often sought after by other European countries and much of his work was already being translated into a.o. German, French and English. In 1925 he was even offered a professorship at the prestigious National Egyptian University in Cairo, the prime university of the Middle East. In 1927 he stepped down as Rector magnificus and professor, but stayed active as adviser up to his death in Leiden in 1936.

During and after his academic tenure Snouck remained a progressive colonial adviser and critic. His reformist vision to solve the challenges of a lasting relationship between the Netherlands and the Indies was based on the principle of association. To achieve this future association and end the existing dualist governance of the Dutch East Indies, he advocated increased autonomy through western education of the indigenous governing elite. In 1923 he called for: "Vigorous reform of the constitution of the Dutch East Indies" where "one has to break with the concept of moral and intellectual inferiority of the natives" and allow them "free and representative democratic bodies and optimal autonomy". Conservative elements in the Netherlands reacted by financing an alternative school for Colonial Civil Servants in Utrecht.

Sources 

The main data on Snouck Hurgonje's studies and colonial policy relating to Islam are available in the archives of the 'Ministry of Colonies' managed by the ‘National Archives’ in The Hague. The archive includes all decisions by the governors-general, all Minister of Colonies mail reports, and all government laws and regulations. Additionally data is available in the Indonesian National Archives in Jakarta and at the ‘Royal Institute of Southeast Asian and Caribbean Studies’ (KITLV) in Leiden and the Leiden University Library.

The archives, correspondence and photos of Snouck Hurgronje are available at Leiden University Library and digitally accessible through Digital Collections Some of his photographs now form part of the Khalili Collection of Hajj and the Arts of Pilgrimage.

The Leiden University Fund, dedicated to university reform is located at the 'Snouck Hurgronjehuis', Snouck's home donated to the University.

Gallery

Works 

 
 Christiaan Snouck Hurgronje (1906). The Achehnese. Volume II. Leiden: Brill.

References

Notes and citations

Bibliography 
 Ibrahim, Alfian. "Aceh and the Perang Sabil." Indonesian Heritage: Early Modern History. Vol. 3, ed. Anthony Reid, Sian Jay and T. Durairajoo. Singapore: Editions Didier Millet, 2001. 132–133
 
 
Le tour du monde - Nouveau journal des voyages "Voyage à la Mecque" Revue N° 1675 published 18 february 1893 by Hachette Paris

External links 

 
 
 
 Britannica article.
 The Revolt in Arabia by Christiaan Snouck Hurgronje
 [The Penetration of Arabia: A Record of the Development of Western Knowledge Concerning the Arabian Peninsula], from 1904, discusses Christiaan Snouck Hurgronje

1857 births
1936 deaths
Dutch orientalists
Dutch scholars of Islam
History of Sumatra
People of the Dutch East Indies
Islam in the Netherlands
Leiden University alumni
Academic staff of Leiden University
Explorers of Asia
Explorers of Arabia
People from Oosterhout
Members of the Royal Netherlands Academy of Arts and Sciences
Indonesianists
Corresponding Fellows of the British Academy